The less-is-better effect is a type of preference reversal that occurs when the lesser or smaller alternative of a proposition is preferred when evaluated separately, but not evaluated together. The term was first proposed by Christopher Hsee.

Identifying the effect

In a 1998 study, Hsee, a professor at the Graduate School of Business of The University of Chicago, discovered a less-is-better effect in three contexts: "(1) a person giving a $45 scarf (from scarves ranging from $5-$50) as a gift was perceived to be more generous than one giving a $55 coat (from coats ranging from $50-$500); (2) an overfilled ice cream serving with 7 oz of ice cream was valued more than an underfilled serving with 8 oz of ice cream; (3) a dinnerware set with 24 intact pieces was judged more favourably than one with 31 intact pieces (including the same 24) plus a few broken ones."

Hsee noted that the less-is-better effect was observed "only when the options were evaluated separately, and reversed itself when the options were juxtaposed.” Hsee explained these seemingly counterintuitive results “in terms of the evaluability hypothesis, which states that separate evaluations of objects are often influenced by attributes that are easy to evaluate rather than by those that are important."

Other studies

The less-is-better effect was demonstrated in several studies that preceded Hsee's 1998 experiment.

In 1992, a team led by Michael H. Birnbaum found "that an inferior risky option (e.g. a 5% chance to win $96 or $0) can be valued more highly than a superior risky option (e.g. a 5% chance to win $96 or $24)."

In a 1994 experiment by Max Bazerman et al., MBA students who were asked to evaluate various hypothetical job offers preferred lower-paying jobs for employers who paid other similarly qualified employees similar salaries to higher-paying jobs for employers who paid other employees more.

In 1995, Victoria Husted Medvec and two colleagues reported that "athletes who had just won silver medals tended to be less happy than those who had just won bronze medals." The researchers explained this as follows: silver medalists felt as if they had just missed out on a gold, while bronze medalists felt as if they had almost not won anything.

A 1996 study by Hsee asked participants to evaluate two used music dictionaries, one of which contained 20,000 entries and had a torn cover, the other of which contained 10,000 entries and looked brand-new. When evaluated separately, the newer-looking book was preferred; when evaluated together, the older book was chosen.

In one study involving 83 students from a large university in the American Midwest, participants were asked to fill out a questionnaire. It asked them to imagine that a friend had given them a $55 wool coat from a store where coats run between $50 and $500, or, alternatively, a $45 wool scarf from a store where scarves cost between $5 and $50. When asked for their relative reactions to the two scenarios, the participants said that they would be happier with the scarf than with the coat and that the purchase of the scarf would reflect greater generosity than the purchase of the coat. Therefore, "if gift givers want their gift recipients to perceive them as generous, it is better for them to give a high-value item from a low-value product category (e.g. a $45 scarf) rather than a low-value item from a high-value product category (e.g. a $55 coat)."

Participants in one study were asked to imagine that they were at the beach and in the mood for ice cream. One set of participants was asked to evaluate the value of 8 ounces of ice cream sold in a 10-ounce cup; another, to evaluate 7 ounces in a 5-ounce cup; a third, to compare the two. The second group liked their overfilled cups more than the first group liked their underfilled cups; but the third group, when presented with both options, recognized that the larger portion was more valuable than the smaller one.

Another study showed that people "felt more grateful for a $45 dollar gift card than a $55 dollar coat." More oddly, they "were happier with a 24-piece dinnerware set that was intact than a 31-piece set, a couple of pieces of which was broken. The 31-piece set contained all the pieces of the 24-piece set, and all of them were intact. This made no difference to the recipients. All they could see was the loss of the broken pieces."

General observations
When consumers assess objects in isolation, they often compare them to other objects in the same category. "It seems that in evaluating a gift, people are neither sensitive to the actual price of the gift, nor to the category of that gift (e.g. whether a coat or a scarf), but they are very sensitive to the relative position of the gift within its category."

Customers tend to be happier when merchants give them a little extra something that costs the merchant relatively little (a bonus scoop of ice cream on a sundae, for example) than when merchants offer a better deal that would cost the merchant more.

Limitations
The less-is-better effect occurs only under specific circumstances. Evidence has shown that it manifests itself only when the options are evaluated individually; it disappears when they are assessed jointly. "If the options are put right next to each other, the effect disappears, as people see the true value of both," states one source. "It's just the gifts in isolation that give people a flipped sense of happiness and gratitude."

Hypothesized causes
Theoretical causes of the less-is-better effect include:
 counterfactual thinking - A study found that bronze medalists are happier than silver medalists, apparently because silver invites comparison to gold whereas bronze invites comparison to not receiving a medal.
 evaluability heuristic and/or fluency heuristic - Hsee hypothesized that subjects evaluated proposals more highly based on attributes that were easier to evaluate (attribute substitution). Another study found that students preferred funny versus artistic posters according to attributes they could verbalize easily, but the preference was reversed when they did not need to explain a reason (see also introspection illusion).
 representativeness heuristic or judgment by prototype - People judge things according to average of a set more easily than size, a component of extension neglect.

Applications
The effect has several practical applications. If a conference speaker thinks that about 50 people will attend his talk, but wants to make it look popular, he should hold it in a small room, with 50 or fewer seats, than a large room with over 100 seats. A chocolatier is better off selling a box containing 24 pieces of top-quality candy than a box containing those 24 pieces plus 16 lower-quality pieces.

A manufacturer may develop two versions of a product and want to know which consumers will prefer. Presenting both to the public lets consumers evaluate differences between them—while presenting them separately better predicts the consumer's actual experience of the product.

See also
 Contrast effect
 Distinction bias
 Omission bias

Notes

References

Cognitive biases